Charles Powell may refer to:
 Charles Powell, Baron Powell of Bayswater (born 1941), British diplomat and businessman
 Charles Powell (historian) (born 1960), British-Spanish historian
 Charles Powell Hamilton (1747–1825), British admiral
 Charles Berkeley Powell (1858–1933), Canadian businessman and politician
 Charles Lawrence Powell (1902–1975), U.S. federal judge
 Charlie Powell (1932–2014), American football player
 Charles Lee Powell (1863–1959), American structural engineer and entrepreneur
 Charles Wesley Powell (1854–1927), American orchidologist